NLRP5, short for NOD-like receptor family pyrin domain containing 5, is an intracellular protein that plays a role in early embryogenesis.  NLRP5 is also known as NACHT, LRR and PYD domains-containing protein 5 (NALP5), Mater protein homolog (MATER), PYPAF8, PAN11, and CLR19.8, and is one of 14 pyrin domain containing members of the NOD-like receptor family of cytoplasmic receptors known to mammals.

In humans, the NLRP5 protein is encoded by the NLRP5 gene.

References

Further reading

LRR proteins
NOD-like receptors